Leytonstone is a London Underground station in Leytonstone in the London Borough of Waltham Forest, east London. It is on the Central line, on the boundary of Zones 3 and 4. Towards Central London the next station is Leyton, while going east from Leytonstone, the line divides into two branches. On the direct route to Woodford and Epping the next stop is Snaresbrook, and on the Hainault loop it is Wanstead. The station is close to Whipps Cross University Hospital.

History
A station at Leytonstone was opened on the same day. In turn it became, from 1862, part of the Great Eastern Railway system and then in 1923 part of the London & North Eastern Railway before being transferred to London Transport in 1947. This formed part of the "New Works Programme 1935 – 1940" that was to see major changes at Leytonstone with the station becoming the junction of the existing Loughton-Epping-Ongar line, newly electrified, with the new tube tunnel running under Eastern Avenue towards Newbury Park. This work saw a complete reconstruction of the station along with the removal of the level crossing at Church Lane and its replacement by an underbridge. The work stopped in May 1940 due to wartime priorities; further delays were caused by the station buildings being hit by a German bomb in January 1944. During the war, the new tunnels were used as an aircraft component factory; the part closest to Leytonstone was a public air-raid shelter.

The station was first served by the Central line on 5 May 1947 when it became the temporary terminus of the line, passengers changing on to steam shuttle onwards to Epping. This ceased on 14 December 1947 with the extension of Underground services to Woodford and Newbury Park.

Notable events

 In honour of the centenary of the birth of film director Sir Alfred Hitchcock (born 13 August 1899 in Leytonstone), the London Borough of Waltham Forest commissioned the Greenwich Mural Workshop to create a series of mosaics of Hitchcock's life and works in the tube station. Work was started in June 2000 and the mosaics were unveiled on 3 May 2001.
 Three people were injured inside the station's ticket hall during the evening of 5 December 2015, with one suffering serious knife injuries. The Metropolitan Police arrested the attacker inside the station after using Tasers against him. Video footage later emerged of the attacker repeatedly shouting "this is for Syria". A remark shouted at the attacker by a witness, "You ain’t no Muslim, bruv", resulted in considerable media comment and was subsequently praised by the then Prime Minister, David Cameron.

Connections
London Buses routes 66, 145, 257, 339, W13, W14, W15, W16 and W19 and night route N8 serve the station and bus station.

Gallery

References

External links
YouTube video of a train arriving on the eastbound platform
Leytonstone Underground Station: Hitchcock Mosaic
Early photograph of the original 1856 station, from Church Lane

Tube stations in the London Borough of Waltham Forest
Former Great Eastern Railway stations
Railway stations in Great Britain opened in 1856
Central line (London Underground) stations
London Underground Night Tube stations
Proposed Chelsea-Hackney Line stations
Tube station